Noam Bramson (born December 13, 1969) is an American politician from the state of New York. He is the mayor of New Rochelle, New York, and has served since being appointed in January 2006 to complete the unexpired term of Mayor Timothy C. Idoni. Bramson was reelected in 2011 with 79% of the vote.

Prior to becoming mayor, Bramson served for ten years on the New Rochelle City Council as a representative of the Fifth City District. In 2013 Bramson was nominated by the Westchester County Democratic Party to be its candidate for Westchester County Executive against incumbent Republican Rob Astorino.

Early life 
Bramson was born to a Jewish family in New Rochelle, New York. He is a first-generation American. Bramson's Polish-born parents were refugees during World War II who met in Israel in the 1950s, married, and moved to the United States.

In 1987, Bramson went to Harvard University, where he completed his undergraduate degree in three years, and then received a master's degree in Public Policy. Bramson was chosen to give a student address at his Harvard's commencement in 1990.

Political career 

From 1992 until 2012, Bramson served as a political consultant and speechwriter for Rep. Nita Lowey. Bramson served on the Boards of numerous civic organizations, including the New Rochelle Campership Fund, the Castle Gallery, the New Rochelle Fund for Educational Excellence, the New Rochelle Council of Community Services, the Westchester Jewish Council, and the United Way of New Rochelle.

City Council 

Bramson returned to New Rochelle after college in 1995, and at the age of 25, was elected to New Rochelle City Council. He won his subsequent election bids in 1999 and 2003, garnering more than 70 percent of the vote.

2002 Assembly challenge 

In 2002, Bramson challenged longtime Democratic Assemblyman Ron Tocci. Bramson won the Democratic primary with 61% of the vote. Tocci switched parties, winning against Bramson in the general election as the Republican Party candidate with 53% of the vote.

Mayor 

In January 2006, Bramson was appointed to a one-year term as mayor to complete the unexpired term of Timothy Idoni.  Bramson won a special election in November 2006 for Mayor. In 2007, Bramson won his first full four-year term and was re-elected in 2011 with 79% of the vote.

Bramson is a member of the Mayors Against Illegal Guns Coalition, a bipartisan group. He has been an advocate of thoughtful community, and regional planning. He led the creation of New Rochelle's first Sustainability Plan, promoted efforts to establish new public access to the Long Island Sound shore, and adopted new land use policies to preserve open space and protect neighborhoods from overdevelopment. Bramson has secured grants for critical infrastructure priorities, including the enhancement of major transportation corridors and the rehabilitation of New Rochelle's playing fields.

2013 race for County Executive 

On April 25, 2013, Bramson defeated Westchester County Board of Legislators Chairman Ken Jenkins of Yonkers and Legislator Bill Ryan of White Plains to become the Democratic Party's nominee for the county's top office. He faced Republican County Executive Rob Astorino in the November 2013 election and lost in the general election.

Personal life 

Bramson married Catherine ("Catie") Stern, Ph.D., a pediatric neuropsychologist, on May 12, 2002. They have two sons.

Electoral history

References

External links

1969 births
Living people
Jewish American people in New York (state) politics
Politicians from New Rochelle, New York
Mayors of places in New York (state)
Politicians from Westchester County, New York
New York (state) Democrats
Harvard Kennedy School alumni
21st-century American Jews
New Rochelle High School alumni